Sárvíz may refer to:

 Sárvíz (Sió) a river in Hungary
 Sárvíz (Zala) a stream in Hungary